The Copenhagen Institute is a Danish Free Market think tank. It was founded in 2003 hosting a conference on tax competition. It has a clear libertarian leaning.

The Copenhagen Institute was originally called MarkedsCentret, but changed its name in 2005. 

The think tank works on policy areas such as: Tax & Welfare, Health Care & Food, Competition & Regulation and Environment & Technology.

The think tank was founded by Chresten Anderson, who previously worked for the Cato Institute in Washington DC.

External links 
 Copenhagen Institutes Web Site

2003 establishments in Denmark
Think tanks established in 2003
Political and economic think tanks based in the European Union
Think tanks based in Denmark
Libertarian think tanks
Libertarianism in Europe